Saccharicola is a genus of fungi in the Massarinaceae family.

References

External links
Index Fungorum

Pleosporales
Taxa named by David Leslie Hawksworth